Sergiy Stakhovsky and Lovro Zovko were the defending champions, but only Zovko tried to defend his 2008 title.
He partnered with Yves Allegro, but they lost to Sébastien Grosjean and Olivier Patience in the quarterfinal.
Colin Fleming and Ken Skupski won in the final 6–1, 6–1, against Grosjean and Patience.

Seeds

Draw

Draw

References
 Doubles Draw

Doubles